Acrosiphonia is a genus of green algae in the family Ulotrichaceae.

References

Ulotrichaceae
Ulvophyceae genera